Dr. Ragheb Moftah  (1898–2001)  was an Egyptian musicologist and scholar of the Coptic music heritage. He co-authored the article on "Coptic Music" for the Coptic Encyclopedia. He spent much of his life studying the recording and notation of Coptic liturgical texts. The son of Habashi Moftah and Labiba Shalaby, Moftah was one of nine children.

Education
He studied in Germany at the Faculty of Agriculture in the University of Bonn in the Rhineland and obtained a BSc in agriculture.  His great passion was music.  He obtained degrees in Music from Bonn and in Catholic Southern Germany at the University of Munich.  He made a studio at St. Mary Coptic Orthodox Church Kasriet El-Rihan in Old Cairo. In 1927 he invited Prof. Ernest Newlandsmith from London, who transcribed all the Coptic Heritage 1928-1936.

Institute of Coptic Studies
In 1955 he was responsible for the Music & Hymn Department at the Institute of Coptic Studies and moved the primary studio he had already made in St. Mary Church. He began recording the hymns and all the Church services with Mlm. Mikhail's voice and then published in more talented voices on cassette tapes, for a total of 54 tapes.

St. Basil's mass
In 1970, he invited the scientist Margaret Toth to co-operate in achieving a transcription of St. Basil's Mass, which Prof. Ernest Newlandsmith had prepared only responses and the first part in each priest (solo) part, The work lasted until everything was accomplished, all the mass with hymns in Musical notation with the Coptic, English and Arabic text. In 1992, he offered all his works to the Library of Congress in Washington, D.C. to be kept over generations using the latest technology. In 1998 The American University in Cairo published the Music transcription of St. Basil's Mass.

Personal life
In 1963 Dr. Moftah married Mary Gabriel Rizq. He is the father of Micah Moftah, Architect.

See also
List of Copts
Coptic music
Ernest Newlandsmith

References
"Coptic Music" (co-authored by Ragheb Moftah), Claremont Coptic Encyclopedia

External links
The Library of the Congress, on Ragheb Moftah and Coptic Music
In Memoriam: Ragheb Moftah
The legacy of Coptic music
Ragheb Moftah:Songs of praise
Ragheb Moftah, A Musical Resurrection
Preserving Pharos Psalms FOR CHRIST
Coptic Medical Society UK
Ragheb Moftah Photo Album
"Coptic Music" (co-authored by Ragheb Moftah), Claremont Coptic Encyclopedia

1898 births
2001 deaths
Coptic Orthodox Christians from Egypt
Coptic music
Egyptian musicologists
Egyptian centenarians
Men centenarians